San Martino Sannita is a comune (municipality) in the Province of Benevento in the Italian region Campania, located about 60 km northeast of Naples and about 9 km southeast of Benevento. As of 31 December 2004, it had a population of 1,247 and an area of 6.3 km2.

San Martino Sannita borders the following municipalities: Montefusco, San Giorgio del Sannio, San Nazzaro, San Nicola Manfredi, Sant'Angelo a Cupolo, Torrioni.

Demographic evolution

References

Cities and towns in Campania